MV Nottingham was a refigerated cargo ship that was built in Scotland in 1949 for the Federal Steam Navigation Co and scrapped in Taiwan in 1971.

She was the second of two ships of this name in the Federal Steam fleet. The first  was a motor ship that was launched in 1941 and sunk with all hands by enemy action on her maiden voyage.

History
John Brown & Company built Nottingham in Clydebank, Glasgow. She was launched on 22 December 1949 and completed in 1950. She had a single screw, powered by a single-acting two-stroke diesel engine.

Nottinghams usual trade was carrying fruit from New Zealand to the United Kingdom. On 11 August 1971 she arrived in Kaohsiung in Taiwan to be scrapped.

References

Bibliography

1949 ships
Merchant ships of the United Kingdom
Ships built on the River Clyde